Mixomyrophis pusillipinna is a species of eel in the family Ophichthidae. It is known only from the Atlantic Ocean in the vicinity of Anguilla.

References

Ophichthidae
Fish described in 1985